Exhilway private capital market or Exhilway Link is an India-based crowdfunding platform. The platform is delayed due to suspension of India-based private equity operations in 2015.

Business Lines
The firm operates two business lines:
 Exhilway private capital market funds and manages the valuations of the fund raising companies.
 Exhilway private capital market assists emerging Small and medium enterprises to file for an IPO.

Competitors
Within the private equity fundraising market, Exhilway private capital market faces competition from the leading seed money companies from India, notably: Mumbai Angels, ICICI Bank & Second Market

See also
Private equity secondary market
Private Equity

References

External links
 (official website)
http://articles.economictimes.indiatimes.com/2012-07-06/news/32566294_1_fund-raising-mumbai-angels-capital-markets
http://articles.economictimes.indiatimes.com/2012-08-04/news/33035516_1_venture-capital-fund-exhilway-private-capital-market-global-private-capital-markets

Private equity secondary market
Investment banks